Renée Manfredi is an American novelist.

Manfredi was co-winner of the 1993 Iowa Short Fiction Award for Where Love Leaves Us.

Born in 1962 in Pittsburgh, Pennsylvania, she earned a BA at the University of Pittsburgh and a MFA at Indiana University, Bloomington.

Books
 Where Love Leaves Us, short stories (Iowa City: University of Iowa Press, 1994).
 Above the Thunder, novel (San Francisco: MacAdam/Cage, 2004).
 Running Away with Frannie, novel (San Francisco: MacAdam/Cage, 2006).

References

 Contemporary Authors Online. The Gale Group, 2006. PEN (Permanent Entry Number):  0000115781.

1962 births
Living people
Writers from Pittsburgh
University of Pittsburgh alumni
American women novelists
Indiana University Bloomington alumni
Novelists from Pennsylvania
21st-century American women